KSHV-TV (channel 45) is a television station in Shreveport, Louisiana, United States, affiliated with MyNetworkTV. It is owned by Nexstar Media Group alongside Texarkana, Texas–licensed NBC affiliate KTAL-TV (channel 6); Nexstar also provides certain services to Fox affiliate KMSS-TV (channel 33) under a shared services agreement (SSA) with Mission Broadcasting. The stations share studios on North Market Street and Deer Park Road in northeast Shreveport, while KSHV-TV's transmitter is located southeast of Mooringsport.

History

Early history
The UHF channel 45 allocation in Shreveport was contested between three groups that competed for the Federal Communications Commission (FCC)'s approval of a construction permit to build and license to operate a new television station. Word of Life Ministries Inc. – a non-stock arm of the Word of Life Center, a nondenominational church on West 70th Street/Meriwether Road (near LA 3132) in southwestern Shreveport that was managed by founding church co-pastor Sam Carr – filed the initial application on October 29, 1986. On September 3, 1987, Word of Life Ministries reached a settlement agreement with the second applicant for the license, Media Communications, Inc., which agreed to dismiss its license application. Three months later on December 9, an application by the third applicant for UHF channel 45, Shreveport-based Godfrey & Associates, was dismissed with prejudice by Joseph Chachkin, the administrative law judge appointed in its dispute over the construction permit with Word of Life, for failure to prosecute; this resulted in the FCC granting the permit to Word of Life.

The station signed on the air on April 15, 1994, as KWLB (for "Word of Life Broadcasting"). operating as an independent station. It mostly aired religious programs, family-oriented shows and cartoons. In March 1995, Lafayette-based White Knight Broadcasting (owned by media executive Sheldon Galloway) purchased the station from Word of Life Ministries for $3.8 million; the sale received FCC approval on May 9, 1995. After switching from its religious programming, the station added general entertainment programming in June 1995.

On August 1, 1995, Lafayette-based Associated Broadcasters Inc. (later renamed Communications Corporation of America) – which had purchased KMSS-TV in March 1994 – entered into a joint sales and shared services agreements with White Knight, under which Associated/KMSS would provide programming, advertising and other administrative services for channel 45. The station – which had changed its callsign to KSHV (in reference to its city of license, Shreveport) on July 26 (and added the -TV suffix on June 29, 2009) – subsequently relocated its operations from the Word of Life Center into KMSS's original studio facilities on Jewella Avenue (between Claiborne Avenue and Ninock Street) in western Shreveport. (The KWLB call letters are currently used by a radio station on 93.1 FM in Red Oak, Oklahoma.)

Both KSHV and KMSS pooled programming inventories, with the former acquiring additional talk and reality shows as well as more recent and higher-profile classic sitcoms and drama series, and more recent syndicated film packages to complement channel 33's offerings. Many higher-rated syndicated shows (including sitcoms and cartoons) continued to air on or were sold directly to KMSS, but some programs were shared by both stations, with some of the stronger programs in channel 33's inventory being added to KSHV's schedule.

Affiliations with UPN and The WB
On August 28, 1995, KSHV-TV became an affiliate of the fledgling United Paramount Network (UPN), assuming the local affiliation rights from CBS affiliate KSLA (channel 12), which had carried UPN's Monday and Tuesday prime time programming during the overnight hours since the network debuted on January 16, by way of network parent Viacom's ownership of KSLA at that time. Once it affiliated with UPN, KSHV began to fill the 7:00 to 9:00 p.m. time slot with feature films and some first-run syndicated programs; in addition, the station added more secular programs to its schedule, but quickly phased out most of its religious programs. (UPN would begin expanding to additional nights between March 1996 and October 1998, when it began programming a five-night-a-week schedule through the extension of its offerings to Thursday and Friday nights.)

On July 7, 1997, KSHV became a secondary affiliate of The WB, allowing viewers throughout the Ark-La-Tex who did not have a cable or satellite subscription to watch that network's programs for the first time. (Dating to the network's January 1995 launch, The WB had been available locally on Time Warner Cable in Shreveport [which had its franchise rights acquired by Comcast in 2006], Cox Communications in Bossier City [which had its franchise rights acquired by Suddenlink Communications in 2006], and other local cable and satellite providers through the superstation feed of Chicago affiliate WGN-TV [now conventional basic cable channel NewsNation].) With this, WB network programming was initially carried on a two-hour delay from 9:00 to 11:00 p.m., immediately following UPN's prime time schedule (which aired in pattern from 7:00 to 9:00 p.m.) on nights when the two networks offered prime time programs.

On January 15, 2001, KSHV switched its primary network allegiance to The WB and shifted UPN to secondary status, swapping the airtimes of the respective network's prime time lineups (with The WB's programming moving to a 7:00 p.m. start on Monday through Friday nights). The following year, the logo that the station adopted at the time—which, accordingly, saw KSHV adopt "WB45" as its branding—began incorporating the UPN network logo as well as the former network's mascot at the time, Michigan J. Frog. (The UPN logo was removed in September 2003, while the Michigan J. Frog image was dropped in September 2005, when The WB "retired" the animated mascot in an effort to change its image from a network targeting a young teenage audience to one targeting young adults.)

On September 1, 2003, KPXJ (channel 21)—which had been sold to Minden Television Company LLC by original parent company Paxson Communications (now Ion Media) for $10 million earlier that summer—took over as the UPN affiliate for the Shreveport–Texarkana market, leaving KSHV-TV exclusively affiliated with The WB. The switch, which also resulted in its original Pax TV (now Ion Television) affiliation being shifted to secondary status, coincided with KPXJ's operations being assumed by KTBS, LLC (owner of ABC affiliate KTBS-TV [channel 3]) under a local marketing agreement, and resulted in some first-run and off-network syndicated programs whose rights had been held by KSHV being moved to KPXJ to fill that station's new general-entertainment-based schedule.

MyNetworkTV affiliation
On January 24, 2006, the respective parent companies of UPN and The WB, CBS Corporation and the Warner Bros. Entertainment division of Time Warner, announced that they would dissolve the two networks to create The CW Television Network, a joint venture between the two media companies that initially featured programs from its two predecessor networks as well as new series specifically produced for The CW. Subsequently, on February 22, 2006, News Corporation announced the launch of MyNetworkTV, a network operated by Fox Television Stations and its syndication division Twentieth Television that was created to primarily to provide network programming to UPN and WB stations with which The CW decided against affiliating based on their local viewership standing in comparison to the outlet that the network ultimately chose, allowing these stations another option besides converting to independent stations.

On March 7, 2006, in a press release announcement by the network, KPXJ was confirmed as The CW's Shreveport charter affiliate. Since the network chose its charter stations based on which of them among The WB and UPN's respective affiliate bodies was the highest-rated in each market, KPXJ was chosen to join The CW over KSHV-TV as it had been the higher-rated of the two stations at the time of its agreement despite channel 45 having had a four-year headstart on KPXJ operation-wise. Eight days later on March 15, News Corporation announced that it had signed an agreement with White Knight Broadcasting, in which KSHV would become the market's MyNetworkTV affiliate, as part of a deal that also saw Fox-affiliated sister station WNTZ-TV in Alexandria being committed to join the network under a secondary affiliation. (That agreement was separate from an agreement that Communications Corporation of America signed for KLAF-LD [now an NBC affiliate] in Lafayette, KWKT-TV in Waco, Texas and WEVV-DT2 in Evansville, Indiana.)

KSHV officially joined MyNetworkTV upon that network's launch on September 5, 2006; although, unlike other WB- and UPN-affiliated stations that were committed to join MyNetworkTV, The WB's prime time programming was carried by KPXJ between 12:00 a.m. and 2:00 a.m. weeknights and 11:00 p.m. and 2:00 a.m. Sunday/early Mondays until September 17, the day before the network formally ceased operations. KPXJ remained a UPN affiliate until September 15, and officially affiliated with The CW when that network debuted on September 18. The station also carried classic television series from the Retro Television Network from September 2008 to January 2009.

KSHV-TV discontinued regular programming on its analog signal, over UHF channel 45, on February 17, 2009, the original date in which full-power television stations in the United States were to transition from analog to digital broadcasts under federal mandate.

On April 24, 2013, Irving, Texas–based Nexstar Broadcasting Group announced that it would acquire the 19 television stations owned by Communications Corporation of America and White Knight Broadcasting for $270 million in cash and stock. Because Nexstar could not legally purchase KMSS under FCC ownership rules as Shreveport has only eight full-power stations (the FCC requires a market to have at least eight unique owners once a duopoly is formed), and KTAL and KMSS were among the four highest-rated stations in the Shreveport market at the time of the transaction, plans called for KMSS to be acquired by Westlake, Ohio-based Nexstar partner company Mission Broadcasting for $27 million, while KSHV was to be sold to a female-controlled company, Denton, Texas-based Rocky Creek Communications (owned by Shirley Green), for $2.1 million.

However, on June 6, 2014, Nexstar announced that it would instead sell KMSS-TV to a new minority-owned company, Houston-based Marshall Broadcasting Group (founded by Pluria Marshall, Jr.) for $58.5 million, an agreement that was among the company's first television station acquisitions, along with the concurrent acquisitions of Fox affiliates KPEJ-TV in Midland, Texas and KLJB/Davenport, Iowa. Subsequently, on August 5, Rocky Creek withdrew its application to acquire KSHV. Nexstar operates KMSS and KSHV under shared services agreements, forming a virtual triopoly with KTAL, leaving Shreveport's six major commercial stations under the control of just three broadcasting companies (the Wray family owns KTBS-TV, while KSLA is owned by Gray Television). The sale of ComCorp to Nexstar, as well as that of KMSS to Marshall and a concurring acquisition of the time brokerage agreement with KSHV, received FCC approval on December 4, 2014, and was completed on January 1, 2015.

On July 1, 2015, KSHV dropped its "My45" branding and changed its branding to "V45", following in line with the branding efforts of other Nexstar-owned MyNetworkTV stations since the early 2010s that were de-emphasizing their promotional connections to that service beyond carrying its programming.

On June 15, 2016, Nexstar announced that it had entered into an agreement with Katz Broadcasting to affiliate 81 stations owned and/or operated by the group—including KTAL-TV, and SSA partner KSHV-TV—with one or more of Katz's four digital multicast networks, Escape (now Court TV Mystery), Laff, Grit and Bounce TV. As part of the agreement, on September 1 of that year, KSHV-TV launched a digital subchannel on virtual channel 45.2 to serve as an affiliate of Escape.

On February 1, 2018, KSHV launched a digital subchannel on virtual channel 45.3 to serve as an affiliate of Ion Television under an expansion of an existing affiliation agreement with Ion Media Networks that Nexstar inherited through its 2016 purchase of Media General. Also on that date, KSHV launched a digital subchannel on virtual channel 45.4 to serve as an affiliate of Quest through an affiliation agreement that Nexstar reached with the Tegna-owned network.

On July 6, 2021, Nexstar exercised its option to acquire KSHV-TV outright. The transaction was completed on October 1.

Newscasts
For the first 22 years of the station's existence, KSHV-TV had never broadcast any local news programming; it had been the only entertainment-based commercial television station in the Shreveport–Texarkana market to have never regularly air newscasts produced specifically for the station. However, KSHV (through the weather production provider's agreement with sister station KMSS) carried daily local weather inserts produced by WeatherVision, a company formed by meteorologist Edward St. Pe to provide weather forecasts for stations without a news department, from 1994 until 2006.

On April 11, 2016, KTAL-TV began producing a half-hour newscast at 5:30 p.m. each weeknight for KSHV, under the title Texarkana First News at 5:30. The program primarily focuses on local news stories centered on the Texarkana, Arkansas–Texas metropolitan area (the latter being sister station KTAL's city of license), along with national and international headlines. (The program is currently the only 5:30 p.m. newscast produced for a Nexstar-owned-or-operated station in the Central and Mountain Time Zones that is not carried on a Fox affiliate operated by the group.)

Subchannels
The station's digital signal is multiplexed:

References

External links
  – KTAL-TV official website (shared with KMSS-TV and KSHV-TV)

MyNetworkTV affiliates
Ion Mystery affiliates
Ion Television affiliates
Quest (American TV network) affiliates
SHV-TV
Nexstar Media Group
Television channels and stations established in 1994
1994 establishments in Louisiana
ATSC 3.0 television stations